Norwich High School is a public high school located in Norwich, Chenango County, New York, U.S.A., and is the only high school operated by the Norwich City School District.

The Norwich High School, (abbr. 'NHS'), is located on Midland Drive in Norwich, New York and is connected to the adjacent Norwich Middle School. NHS is known as the "Home of the Purple Tornado", the mascot symbol and pride of the Norwich City School District athletic teams, donning the spirit colors of purple and white.

The current principal is David Daniels.

The NHS/NMS buildings have recently undergone renovations, as well as Ulrich Field, the school's athletic field.

Norwich High School houses grades 9-12 with approximately 650 students. Class sizes averages between 18-23 students. The high school offers a variety of courses which include Honors, Advanced Placement (English, Art, Social Studies, Science, Foreign Language) College level through Morrisville (Science and Math) and a variety of electives. In addition, a program in conjunction with Rochester Institute of Technology, titled Project Lead the Way, is available.  This course affords students the opportunity to take college level courses in engineering while enrolled in high school.

Mission Statement 
Through the use of all available resources, it shall be the Mission of the Norwich City School District to produce productive citizens who can successfully collaborate and compete in a global society...To develop and provide for each enrolled student a program of experiences, activities and services designed to ensure maximum opportunities for lifelong intellectual, psycho-social, personal and physical growth. It shall further be the Mission of the District to ensure the delivery of such experiences, activities, and services within an interpersonal atmosphere marked by order, warmth and genuine concern for each individual’s well-being as well as appropriate physical environments which support and contribute positively to learning.

Notable faculty
John Barsha (born Abraham Barshofsky; 1898–1976), professional football player

Footnotes

Schools in Chenango County, New York
Public high schools in New York (state)